Live! The World of Ike & Tina is a live double album released by Ike & Tina Turner on United Artists Records in 1973.

Recording and release 
Live! The World of Ike & Tina was recorded in various cities during Ike & Tina Turner's European tour. It was produced by Ike Turner, Jackie Clark, Soko Richardson, and Warren Dawson; mixed by Ike and John Mills.

The album showcases Ike & Tina Turner's forte of covering different genres of music. The songs on the album range from the rock of the Beatles and the Rolling Stones to the r&b of Hank Ballard to the blues of Elmore James. It also contains original compositions by the Turners.

The album peaked at No. 47 on the Billboard Soul LPs chart and No. 211 on Bubbling Under The Top LPs.

Critical reception 
Record World (September 8, 1973): "The spectacular musical & sexual excitement generated by Ike & Tina explodes from a fabulous double -album recorded scorchingly live throughout Europe. Rough raunchy rockers include 'She Came In Through the Bathroom Window,' 'Stand By Me,' and 'Honky Tonk Woman.' Dynamite!"

Billboard (September 8, 1973):The special magic of the Ike and Tina Turner Show always seems to shine through best on their "live" outings, where crowd response can be heard and the team can make improvisations. Ike and Tina are a highly visual as well as musical act, and their impact is stronger on sets such as this. In this double set, Tina is as strong and lusty voiced as ever. The band is tight and Ike contributes strongly with his vocals and arrangements.

Awards and nominations 
The gatefold cover was illustrated by Mike Salisbury which was nominated for a Grammy for Best Album Package at the 16th Annual Grammy Awards.

Reissues 
Live! The World of Ike & Tina was digitally remastered and released on CD by BGO Records in 2018.

Track listing

Chart performance

References 

1973 live albums
Ike & Tina Turner live albums
United Artists Records albums
Albums produced by Ike Turner
Live funk rock albums